Lost Songs 95–98 is the fifth studio album by musician David Gray. Originally released on 31 July 2000, the album charted at number 55 in the UK. The album was re-released in the UK on 12 February 2001 and charted at number 7.  The songs on the album were written between 1995 and 1998, and recorded across 10 days in October 1999.

Track listing

Credits

Musicians
 David Gray – vocals, guitar, Wurlitzer
 Craig McClune – drums, bass, backing vocals
 Tim Bradshaw – bass, piano, organ, Wurlitzer

Production
 Produced by David Gray, Iestyn Polson, and Craig McClune.
 Recorded and mixed by Iestyn Polson.
 Mastered by Dave Turner.
 Design by Yumi Matote.
 Photography by John Ross and Lawrence Watson.

Charts

Weekly charts

Year-end charts

Certifications

References

2001 albums
David Gray (musician) albums
East West Records albums
IHT Records albums
Albums produced by Iestyn Polson